Since its foundation, Al Hilal has had 65 managers. The first was Hasan Sultan, and the current is Ramón Díaz.

List

References

 
Al-Hilal